Jae (real name Sandra Gerth; born March 19, 1978, in Müllheim) is a German author of lesbian fiction. Her work is published in English as well as in German.

Early life and education 

Jae grew up in the southwestern corner of Germany and started writing at the age of eleven. She graduated from the University of Freiburg in 2004 with a degree in psychology. She worked as a psychologist until 2013, when she started writing full-time. She is also the senior editor at Ylva Publishing, one of the largest lesbian fiction publishing houses in the world.

Writing career and awards 

Her writing career began in 2007, when she published the first edition of Backwards to Oregon with L-Book ePublisher, a now-defunct publishing house. In 2012, she joined Ylva Publishing. She mostly writes lesbian romances across all subgenres, including contemporary romance, historical romance, paranormal romance, and romantic suspense. She writes her novels in English and then translates them into her native language, German.

Her works won numerous awards, among them:

 2009: Lesbian Fiction Readers Choice Award for Second Nature (first edition)
 2010: eLit Award (silver) in the category Gay/Lesbian for Second Nature (first edition)
 2010: Golden Crown Literary Society Award in the category Historical Romance for Backwards to Oregon (first edition)
 2010: Golden Crown Literary Society Award in the category Romantic Suspense for Next of Kin (first edition)
 2010: Golden Crown Literary Society Award in the category Speculative Fiction for Second Nature (first edition)
 2010: Rainbow Award for Excellence (first place) for Conflict of Interest (first edition)
 2010: Rainbow Award for Excellence (third place) for Next of Kin (first edition)
 2011: Lesbian Fiction Readers Choice Award for Hidden Truths (first edition)
 2012: eLit Award (silver) in the category Gay/Lesbian for Something in the Wine
 2012: Golden Crown Literary Society Award in the category Historical Romance for Hidden Truths (first edition)
 2014: Golden Crown Literary Society Award in the category Anthology for Beyond the Trail
 2014: Rainbow Award (second place) in the category Best Lesbian Contemporary and Erotic Romance for Departure from the Script
 2014: Rainbow Award (second place) in the category Best Lesbian Paranormal Romance for True Nature
 2015: Rainbow Award (third place) in the category Best Lesbian Contemporary and Erotic Romance for Under a Falling Star
 2016: Golden Crown Literary Society Award in the category Paranormal/Horror for Good Enough to Eat
 2016: Rainbow Award (third place) in the category Best Lesbian Contemporary and Erotic Romance for Just Physical
 2016: Rainbow Award (third place) in the category Best Lesbian Historical & Paranormal Romance for Shaken to the Core
 2017: Golden Crown Literary Society Award in the category Historical Fiction for Shaken to the Core
 2017: Rainbow Award (first place) in the category Best Lesbian Contemporary and Erotic Romance for Heart Trouble
 2017: Rainbow Award (second place) in the category Best Lesbian Contemporary and Erotic Romance for Falling Hard
 2018: eLit Award (silver) in the category LGBT Fiction for Perfect Rhythm
 2018: Golden Crown Literary Society Award in the category Contemporary Romance – Long Novels for Perfect Rhythm
 2018: IPPY Award (bronze) in the category Best Romance/Erotica E-Book for Perfect Rhythm
 2019: Lambda Literary Award for Lesbian Romance (finalist) for Just for Show
 2020: Lambda Literary Award for Lesbian Romance (finalist) for The Roommate Arrangement
 2021: Lambda Literary Award for Lesbian Romance (finalist) for Wrong Number, Right Woman
 2021: Golden Crown Literary Society in the categories Ann Bannon Popular Choice and Contemporary Romance: Long Novels for Wrong Number, Right Woman

In 2021 she was the recipient of an Alice B Award.

Personal 

Jae lives in Freiburg im Breisgau, Germany.

Works 

Series

Standalone romances:

 Paper Love. Ylva Publishing, Kriftel 2018, .
 Just for Show. Ylva Publishing, Kriftel 2018, .
 Happily Ever After (short story collection). Ylva Publishing, Kriftel 2018, .
 Perfect Rhythm. Ylva Publishing, Kriftel 2017, .
 Falling Hard. Ylva Publishing, Kriftel 2017, .
 Heart Trouble. Ylva Publishing, Kriftel 2016, .
 Shaken to the Core. Ylva Publishing, Kriftel 2016, .
 Under a Falling Star. Ylva Publishing, Kriftel 2014, .

Hollywood series

 Departure from the Script. Ylva Publishing, Kriftel 2014, .
 Damage Control. Ylva Publishing, Kriftel 2015, .
 Dress-tease (short story). Ylva Publishing, Kriftel 2015, .
 Just Physical. Ylva Publishing, Kriftel 2015, .

Moonstone series

 Something in the Wine. Ylva Publishing, Kriftel 2012, .
 Seduction for Beginners (short story). Ylva Publishing, Kriftel 2013, .

Oregon series

 Backwards to Oregon. Ylva Publishing, Kriftel 2013, .
 Beyond the Trail. Ylva Publishing, Kriftel 2013, .
 Hidden Truths. Ylva Publishing, Kriftel 2014, .
 Lessons in Love and Life (short story). Ylva Publishing, Kriftel, 2014, .

Portland Police Bureau series

 Conflict of Interest. Ylva Publishing, Kriftel 2014, .
 Next of Kin. Ylva Publishing, Kriftel 2015, .
 Change of Pace (short story). Ylva Publishing, Kriftel 2015, .

The Shape-Shifter series

 Manhattan Moon. Ylva Publishing, Kriftel 2012, .
 Natural Family Disasters. Ylva Publishing, Kriftel 2013, .
 True Nature. Ylva Publishing, Kriftel 2013, .
 Second Nature. Ylva Publishing, Kriftel 2013, .

The Vampire Diet series

 Co-authored with Alison Grey: Good Enough to Eat. Ylva Publishing, Kriftel 2015, .
 Coitus Interruptus Dentalis (short story). Ylva Publishing, Kriftel 2015, .

Audiobooks

 Under a Falling Star. Ylva Publishing, Kriftel 2016
 Something in the Wine. Ylva Publishing, Kriftel 2018
 Perfect Rhythm. Tantor Audio 2018
 Paper Love. Tantor Audio 2018
 Just for Show. Tantor Audio 2018

References

External links 

 Jae’s website
 Jae’s author bio at Ylva Publishing

English-language writers from Germany
21st-century German novelists
University of Freiburg alumni
German lesbian writers
German LGBT novelists
1978 births
Living people
Pseudonymous women writers
Lesbian novelists
21st-century German women writers
21st-century pseudonymous writers